A bail (also spelled "bale") is a component of certain types of jewelry, mostly necklaces, that is used to attach a pendant or stone. The bail is normally placed in the center of the necklace where the pendant hangs.

Some bails are made so a pendant can be attached after the necklace production is completed. This way, a necklace design can be mass-produced for multiple companies and the pendants can be attached after the necklaces are shipped to them.

A classic bail allows the chain to pass through and is connected by a ring to the pendant. Bails are a frequently pre-made component used on an otherwise handmade piece of jewelry.

A pendant can also be made with a "hidden bail." A hidden bail is typically connected to the back of a pendant in such a way that the chain can pass through and support the pendant, but the bail cannot be seen.

References

External links
White Gold, Emerald and Diamond Necklace

Jewellery making
Beadwork
Jewellery components